Vicki Cardwell BEM (née Hoffmann, born 21 April 1955, in Adelaide, South Australia) is a former World No. 1 squash player from Australia. She was one of the leading players on the international squash circuit from the late-1970s through to the mid-1990s. During her career, she won the World Open in 1983, and captured the British Open title four consecutive times in 1980-83.

Since retiring from the top-level game, Cardwell has enjoyed continued success in seniors events. She won four World Masters Championships titles between 1987 and 1995.

Cardwell has been inducted into the Australian Sport Hall of Fame and the Squash Australia Hall of Fame. The Australian government has also acknowledged her contribution and services to Australian sport by awarding her the British Empire Medal.

See also
 Official Women's Squash World Ranking
 List of WISPA number 1 ranked players
 List of squash players
 British Open Squash Championships

References

1955 births
Living people
Sportspeople from Adelaide
Australian female squash players
Recipients of the British Empire Medal
Sport Australia Hall of Fame inductees